Alex Monsour (born May 5, 1962) is an American politician in the U.S. state of Mississippi. From 2008 to 2017, he represented the 54th district in the Mississippi House of Representatives. He resigned on July 2, 2017, to become the South Ward alderman for the city of Vicksburg.

He is a native of Lake Charles, Louisiana.

References

1962 births
Living people
Politicians from Lake Charles, Louisiana
Politicians from Vicksburg, Mississippi
Republican Party members of the Mississippi House of Representatives
21st-century American politicians